North of the Rio Grande is a 1937 American Western film directed by Nate Watt and written by Joseph O'Donnell. The film stars William Boyd, George "Gabby" Hayes, Russell Hayden, Morris Ankrum, Bernadene Hayes and Jack Rutherford. The film was released on June 25, 1937, by Paramount Pictures.

Plot
Hopalong Cassidy's Brother, Buddy, is shot in the back by the Deputy Sheriff Plunkett.  His friend Lucky tries to testify against Plunkett but is thwarted by the crooked coroner Stoneham. Lucky tells Buddy's wife, Mary, that he's dead...then tells her he's going to tell Hopalong Cassidy. Hoppy plans to enter town anonymously as an outlaw and work from that premise. Hoppy arrives posing as an outlaw to avenge his brother's killing by Plunkett. After robbing a train and killing Plunkett, he gets to meet the boss known as the Lone Wolf and lead his next job. Seeking help from Stoneman to capture the outlaws, he realizes too late that Stoneman is the Lone Wolf and is captured.

Cast  
 William Boyd as Hopalong Cassidy
 George "Gabby" Hayes as Windy Halliday
 Russell Hayden as Lucky Jenkins
 Morris Ankrum as Henry Stoneham / Lone Wolf 
 Bernadene Hayes as Faro Annie
 Jack Rutherford as 'Ace' Crowder
 Lorraine Randall as Mary Cassidy
 Walter Long as Patrick 'Bull' O'Hara
 Lee J. Cobb as RR President Wooden 
 Al Ferguson as Deputy Sheriff Jim Plunkett
 John Beach as Clark

Production

The railroad scenes were filmed on the Sierra Railroad in Tuolumne County, California.

References

External links 
 
 
 
 
 Youtube

1937 films
American Western (genre) films
1937 Western (genre) films
Paramount Pictures films
Films directed by Nate Watt
Hopalong Cassidy films
American black-and-white films
1930s English-language films
1930s American films